Events in 2023 in anime.

Releases

Films
A list of anime films that will be released in theaters between January 1 and December 31, 2023.

Television series
A list of anime television series that will debut between January 1 and December 31, 2023.

Original net animations
A list of original net animations that will debut between January 1 and December 31, 2023.

Original video animations
A list of original video animations that will debut between January 1 and December 31, 2023.

Deaths

February
February 5: Takako Sasuga, Japanese voice actress (voice of Tarao Fuguta in Sazae-san, Hajime in Tensai Bakabon, Akubi in Hakushon Daimao, Hata-bō in Osomatsu-kun, Twink in Princess Knight, Monomi in the Danganronpa franchise), dies at age 87.
February 13: Leiji Matsumoto, Japanese animator and manga artist (Space Battleship Yamato, Galaxy Express 999, Space Pirate Captain Harlock, Queen Millennia, Queen Emeraldas), dies from acute heart failure at age 85.
February 15: Shōzō Iizuka, Japanese actor (voice of Yoshio Marui in Mister Ajikko, Ryu Jose in Mobile Suit Gundam, Happosai Hieta in Nintama Rantaro, Nappa in Dragon Ball Z, Caramel Man in Dr. Slump, Dogen Awakusu in Durarara!!), dies from acute heart failure at age 89.
February 16: Maon Kurosaki, Japanese singer (performed theme songs for Highschool of the Dead, A Certain Magical Index, Reincarnated as a Sword, Danganronpa 3: The End of Hope's Peak High School Future Arc, Tokyo Ravens, Jormungand), dies from complications from chronic illness at age 35.
February 23: Junnosuke Kuroda, Japanese musician and guitarist for the band Sumika (performed theme songs for Wotakoi: Love Is Hard for Otaku, My Hero Academia: Heroes Rising, Mix, I Want to Eat Your Pancreas, A Couple of Cuckoos), dies at age 34.
February 25: Mitsuo Senda, Japanese voice actor (voice of Yoneo Yamada in Ojamanga Yamada-kun, Jeff in Giant Gorg, Elder Squirrel in Gon, Great Toad Sage in Naruto Shippuden, Cai Ze in Kingdom, Smiley in Sherlock Hound), dies from ischemic heart failure at age 82.

March
March 2: Ryuho Okawa, Japanese religious leader (Happy Science) and anime producer (The Rebirth of Buddha, The Laws of the Universe), dies at age 66.
March 5: Takahiro Kimura, Japanese animator (City Hunter, Idol Densetsu Eriko, Mobile Suit Victory Gundam) and character designer (Code Geass, Code Geass Lelouch of the Re;surrection, The King of Braves GaoGaiGar, Betterman, Mobile Suit Gundam Hathaway), dies from amyloidosis at age 58.

References

External links 
Japanese animated works of the year, listed in the IMDb

Years in anime
anime
anime